Mill Branch is a  long 1st order tributary to Tussocky Branch in Sussex County, Delaware.

Course
Mill Branch rises in Ralphs, Delaware and then flows northerly into Tussocky Branch about 0.5 miles north of Ralphs, Delaware.

Watershed
Mill Branch drains  of area, receives about 44.6 in/year of precipitation, has a topographic wetness index of 816.27 and is about 20% forested.

See also
List of Delaware rivers

References

Rivers of Delaware
Rivers of Sussex County, Delaware
Tributaries of the Nanticoke River